, better known as  or Keijirō (慶次郎), was a Japanese samurai of the Sengoku period through early Edo period. He was famously the nephew of Maeda Toshiie and Maeda Matsu. In legends and fictions, he is one of the most celebrated kabukimono (wild men) of the time period who is known for his monstrous height and his peerless strength. Toshimasu's horse and companion, Matsukaze, was one of the most famous warhorses in Japan.

Biography
In 1543, Toshimasu was born in the village of Arako (present-day Nakagawa-ku, Nagoya), Toshimasu was born to the Takigawa Clan, originally the son of Takigawa Kazumasu. He was adopted by Maeda Toshihisa, the older brother of Maeda Toshiie. Toshimasu served under Oda Nobunaga along with his uncle. Toshimasu was originally intended to inherit Maeda family headship; however, after Oda Nobunaga replaced Toshihisa with Toshiie as Maeda family head, he lost this position. Perhaps because of this loss of inheritance, Toshimasu is well known for quarreling with his uncle.

Keiji's armor can still be seen today at the Miyasaka Museum.

In 1581, Toshimasu was under the command of his uncle, and made a reputation for himself through conflicts within Noto Province and was rewarded with 5,000 koku. 

In 1584, during the Battle of Komaki and Nagakute, Toshimasu came with Maeda Toshiie's to rescue Suemori Castle when was attacked by Sassa Narimasa. 

When Maeda Toshihisa passed away in 1587, Toshimasu sent his son into the Maeda family's service. Keiji was barred from Toyotomi's Kyushu Campaign for his wild ways. 

In 1590, he continued to help his uncle in the Odawara campaign. After Odawara campaign, Toshimasu returned to the capital and devoted himself to arts and literature. Either after Toshihisa's death or in 1590, relations between him and Toshiie grew sour. He fled from the Maeda family without taking his wife or child. After his escape, he resided in Kyoto. While in Kyoto, Toshimasu met and befriended Naoe Kanetsugu from Uesugi clan. The two became close friends, and Toshimasu agreed to join Kanetsugu at Sekigahara Campaign, in the Uesugi clan's invasion of Aizu. 

Later in 1600, at Siege of Hasedō against Mogami clan and Date clan, Uesugi failed and Toshimasu was appointed to lead the rear guard during the retreat. Riding his horse "Matsukaze" into battle and brandishing a two-pronged spear, he made a splendid show of force. Due in part to Toshimasu's actions, the Uesugi forces were able to retreat largely intact. Legend says he broke through the enemy lines with only eight riders, and shattered their formation. After the Uesugi clan's move to the Yonezawa Domain, Toshimasu remained as a retainer and spent half retired life at Mukuan (Toshimasu`s fortified residence).

Matsukaze
Matsukaze ("wind in the pines") was Toshimasu's famous mount.  According to the legend, he was bred of only the finest horses, but he refused to let anyone ride him and eventually ran away. Toshimasu managed to tame the wild horse, possibly due to Toshimasu's own wild personality. Since then, the two were never seen apart.

Matsukaze was said to be a horse of immense strength, able to carry his master's large frame for days. Supposedly, Matsukaze ran away after his master's death, never seen again.

Depictions in fiction 

Toshimasu is a playable character from the Western Army in the original Kessen and in Samurai Warriors and Warriors Orochi under the name Keiji.

He is also playable in the Sengoku Basara series, as Maeda Keiji.

He is a playable character in Pokémon Conquest (Pokémon + Nobunaga's Ambition in Japan), with his partner Pokémon being Bastiodon and Terrakion.

In 2015, Tatsuya Fuji played the role of Toshimasu in the jidaigeki drama Kabukimono Keiji.

External links
Yonezawa Maeda Keiji`s club 米澤前田慶次の会

References

Samurai
1612 deaths
Maeda clan
Uesugi retainers
1543 births
Warhorses